The SP-57 is a highway in the eastern and the southeastern parts of the state of São Paulo in Brazil. The highway is unnamed on its entire length. The highway runs from BR-116 up to Siderúrgica (Ponte de Ferro).

See also 
 Parelheiros
 Itanhaém

References 

Highways in São Paulo (state)